WKK may refer to:

WKK, the IATA code for Aleknagik Airport, an airport in Aleknagik, Alaska, United States
WKK, the National Rail code for Wakefield Kirkgate railway station, West Yorkshire, England